Model is a 1997 South Korean television series starring Kim Nam-joo, Han Jae-suk, Jang Dong-gun, Yum Jung-ah and So Ji-sub. It aired on SBS from April 9 to August 7, 1997 on Wednesdays and Thursdays at 21:45 for 36 episodes.

Jang Hyuk made his television drama debut in Model.

Plot
Song Kyung-rin is a fashion designer, but after top male model Jo Won-joon refused to work for her, she gets a taste of modeling and decides to become a model herself. Lee Jung just arrived in Korea from America and he, too, has an interest in modeling. Through fate, Jung helps out Kyung-rin and they fall in love. But behind Jung's return to Korea there is a deep, dark secret and a plan for revenge.

Cast
Kim Nam-joo as Song Kyung-rin 
Han Jae-suk as Jo Won-joon
Jang Dong-gun as Lee Jung
Yum Jung-ah as Park Soo-ah
Lee Young-beom as Soo-ah's husband
Song Seon-mi as Kim Yi-joo
Lee Sun-jin as Na Pil-soon
Jun Kwang-ryul as Yoo Jang-hyuk
So Ji-sub as Song Kyung-chul
Jang Hyuk as Joon-ho
Yoo Hye-ri as Yu-ri
Jung Dong-hwan
Chun Ho-jin as Jo Tae-sik
Ha Yoo-mi
Yoon Young-joon
Kim Yong-sun
Seo Bum-shik

References

External links

Korean-language television shows
1997 South Korean television series debuts
1997 South Korean television series endings
1990s South Korean television series
Seoul Broadcasting System television dramas
Modeling-themed television series
Television shows written by Lee Kyung-hee